The Legs mansion (奎宿, pinyin: Kuí Xiù) is one of the Twenty-eight mansions of the Chinese constellations.  It is one of the western mansions of the White Tiger.

Cultural significance
In East Asian cultures, the Legs mansion (Kuí Xiù) represents wisdom, scholarship and literature. A notable example is a structure known as "Kuiwen Pavilion" (奎文閣) in the many Confucius temples in China  and other East Asian countries.

Asterisms

See also
Kui Xing

Chinese constellations